I3C may refer to:

 I3C (bus), an inter-circuit protocol evolved from I²C
 Indole-3-carbinol, a chemical
Interoperable Informatics Infrastructure Consortium, a collaboration of organizations aiming to develop a set of common protocols and standards in bioinformatics